The 2016 United States Men's Curling Championship was held from February 6 to 13 at the Jacksonville Veterans Memorial Arena in Jacksonville, Florida. It was held in conjunction with the 2016 United States Women's Curling Championship.

Teams
Ten teams participated in the 2016 national championship. The teams are listed as follows:

Round-robin standings
Final round-robin standings

Round-robin results

Draw 1
Saturday, February 6, 4:30 pm

Draw 2
Sunday, February 7, 8:00 am

Draw 3
Sunday, February 7, 4:00 pm

Draw 4
Monday, February 7, 8:00 am

Draw 5
Monday, February 7, 4:00 pm

Draw 6
Tuesday, February 8, 10:00 am

Draw 7
Tuesday, February 8, 7:00 pm

Draw 8
Wednesday, February 9, 10:00 am

Draw 9
Wednesday, February 9, 7:00 pm

Playoffs

1 vs. 2
Thursday, February 11, 8:00 pm

3 vs. 4
Thursday, February 11, 8:00 pm

Semifinal
Friday, February 12, 3:00 pm

Final
Saturday, February 13, 6:00 pm

Statistics

Perfect games

References

External links

United States Men's Curling Championship
United States Men's Curling Championship
Curling in Florida
United States National Curling Championships
Curling Men's Championship